The 2010–11 Gaziantepspor season will be the 25th consecutive season for Gaziantep in the Turkish Super League.They will also compete in the Turkish Cup

Current squad

Gaziantepspor transfers

In:

 
Out:

Current coaching staff

Süper Lig

League table

Matches

Kickoff times are in EET.

Turkish Cup

Group A

Group stage

Quarter-finals

Semi-finals

Gaziantepspor seasons
Turkish football clubs 2010–11 season